João Carlos Rodrigues da Costa (born 18 November 1973), known as Costa, is a Portuguese football coach and a former player.

Club career
He made his Primeira Liga debut for Felgueiras on 20 August 1995 in a game against Chaves.

Honours

Club
Porto
Taça de Portugal: 1997–98

International
Portugal Under-16
UEFA European Under-16 Championship: 1989

References

External links
 
 

1973 births
Sportspeople from Braga
Living people
Portuguese footballers
Portugal youth international footballers
Portugal under-21 international footballers
C.D. Nacional players
Liga Portugal 2 players
A.D. Ovarense players
F.C. Felgueiras players
Primeira Liga players
FC Porto players
Vitória S.C. players
Rio Ave F.C. players
Vitória F.C. players
G.D. Chaves players
C.D. Trofense players
Louletano D.C. players
Merelinense F.C. players
Portuguese football managers
Association football midfielders